Lady Day is a studio album by Amii Stewart released in 2004 arranged by Emanuele Friello with original songs by Emanuele Friello and Amii Stewart. The album is the Italian cast recording of a musical based on the life of American jazz and blues singer Billie Holiday co-written by and starring Stewart.

Track listing
"All the Men in Her Life" (Intro) (Emanuele Friello, Amii Stewart) - 1:05 
"Take the "A" Train" (Billy Strayhorn) - 2:37 
"The Man I Love" (George Gershwin, Ira Gershwin) - 3:31 
"Them There Eyes" (Maceo Pinkard, Doris Tauber, William Tracey) - 3:23 
"Last Blues Refrain" (Emanuele Friello, Amii Stewart) - 4:40 
"Lover Man" (Jimmy Davis, Roger Ramirez, Jimmy Sherman) - 4:06 
"Tain't Nobody's Business If I Do" (Porter Grainger, Everett Robbins) - 2:55 
"Strange Fruit" (Lewis Allan) - 3:14 
"It Don't Mean a Thing" (Duke Ellington, Irving Mills) - 2:51 
"God Bless the Child" (Arthur Herzog Jr., Billie Holiday) - 2:56 
"All the Men in Her Life" (Emanuele Friello, Amii Stewart) - 4:50 
"Fine and Mellow" (Billie Holiday) - 4:11 
"Don't Explain" (Arthur Herzog Jr., Billie Holiday) - 3:10 
"Night and Day" (Cole Porter) - 2:27 
"What a Little Moonlight Can Do" (Finale) (Harry Woods) - 2:17 
"All the Men in Her Life" (Bonus Track) (Emanuele Friello, Amii Stewart) - 4:50

Personnel
 Amii Stewart - vocals
 Timothy Martin  - vocals (tracks 2 & 5)
 Massimo Reale  - vocals (track 11)

Sources
  Lady Day, Il Musical, 

2004 albums
Amii Stewart albums